Allama might stand for:
 Allama Prabhu, a mystic-saint and Vachana poet of the Kannada language in the 12th century
 Allama (film), an upcoming film
 Allamah, an honorary title carried by the highest scholars of Islamic thought